Chenderiang (Jawi: چيندريڠ) is a mukim and a Chinese village in Batang Padang District, Perak, Malaysia. The “Chenderiang” name was origin from Cantik and 靓 (liang) which both mean beautiful in Malay and Chinese.

There is an century-old Chinese temple known as Shui Yue Gong Temple (水月宮) which was established in 1892.

Geography
Chenderiang spans over an area of 244 km2 with a population of 20,100 people (2005).

References

Batang Padang District
Mukims of Perak